Boogie Boy is a 1998 film written and directed by Craig Hamann and produced by Braddon Mendelson. It stars Traci Lords, as well as Mark Dacascos, Emily Lloyd, Jaimz Woolvett, Frederic Forrest, Joan Jett, Robert Bauer, and Linnea Quigley. The film features music by Michael Knott.

Premise
A man who has just been released from prison vows to start a new life, but is put to the test when an old cellmate appears.

Cast
 Mark Dacascos as Jesse Page
 Emily Lloyd as Hester
 Jaimz Woolvett as Larry Storey
 Traci Lords as Shonda Lee Bragg
 Karen Sheperd as Marlene
 Linnea Quigley as Gretchen
 Jonathan Scarfe as Leland Bowles
 John Koyama as Lawrence Wong
 Ethan Jensen as Dave
 Phil Culotta as Mike
 Frederic Forrest as Edsel Dundee
 Ben Browder as Freddy
 James Lew as Jason
 Scott Sowers as "Bulldog"
 Robert Bauer as "Breeze"
 John Hawkes as "T-Bone"
 Joan Jett as "Jerk"
 Michael Pena as Drug Dealer
 Brett R. Goetsch as Roadie
 Tony Bruno as Rocket Brutes Band Member
 Sean Koos as Rocket Brutes Band Member
 Tommy Price as Rocket Brutes Band Member
 Rich Turner as The Bartender

References

External links
 Producer's Boogie Boy webpage
 aka Hard Proof - Germany

1997 films
American LGBT-related films
1998 crime films
1998 films
American crime films
1990s English-language films
1990s American films